The 1982 Oregon gubernatorial election took place on November 2, 1982. Incumbent Republican Governor Victor Atiyeh won re-election to a second term in a landslide, defeating Democratic state senator Ted Kulongoski and carrying every county in the state. , this is the last time that a Republican was elected Governor of Oregon, and the most recent gubernatorial election in which every county voted for the same nominee. Twenty years later, Kulongoski was elected governor, where he served two terms.

Candidates

Democratic
 Ted Kulongoski, labor lawyer and Oregon state senator and nominee for U. S. Senate in 1980

Republican
 Victor G. Atiyeh, incumbent Governor of Oregon

Election results

References

1982
Gubernatorial
Oregon